The 2013–14 Rutgers Scarlet Knights men's basketball team represented Rutgers University during the 2013–14 NCAA Division I men's basketball season. The Scarlet Knights, led by first year head coach Eddie Jordan, played their home games at the Louis Brown Athletic Center, better known as The RAC, as members of the American Athletic Conference, formerly known as the Big East Conference. They finished the season 12–21, 5–13 in AAC play to finish in seventh place. They advanced to the quarterfinals of the AAC tournament where they lost to Louisville.

This was their final year in the American as they moved to the Big Ten Conference in July 2014.

Roster

Schedule

|-
!colspan=9 style="background:#CC0000; color:#000000;"| Exhibition

|-
!colspan=9 style="background:#CC0000; color:#000000;"| Regular season

|-
!colspan=9 style="background:#CC0000; color:#000000;"| American Athletic Conference tournament

References

Rutgers Scarlet Knights men's basketball seasons
Rutgers
2013 in sports in New Jersey
2014 in sports in New Jersey